Remote SIM provisioning is a specification realized by GSMA that allows consumers to remotely activate the subscriber identity module (SIM) embedded in a portable device such as a smart phone, smart watch, fitness band or tablet computer. The specification was originally part of the GSMA's work on eSIM and it is important to note that remote SIM provisioning is just one of the aspects that this eSIM specification includes. The other aspects being that the SIM is now structured into "domains" that separate the operator profile from the security and application "domains". In practise "eSIM upgrade" in the form of a normal SIM card is possible (using the Android 9 eSIM APIs) or eSIM can be included into an SOC. The requirement of GSMA certification is that personalisation packet is decoded inside the chip and so there is no way to dump Ki, OPc and 5G keys. Another important aspect is that the eSIM is owned by the enterprise, and this means that the enterprise now has full control of the security and applications in the eSIM, and which operators profiles are to be used.

Background to the specification 

In the background of the technology looked to address the following issues:
 The development of non-removable SIM technology - a new generation of SIM-cards like MFF which are soldered into the device.
 The appearance and support by mobile operators of the concept of ABC (always best connected) – the opportunity get quality connections from any mobile operator at any point in time.
 The explosive growth of the Internet of Things (IoT) - according to Gartner about 8.4 billion connections in 2017 (up 31% from 2016).
 The cost and effort required to swap a SIM in a device that has been deployed in the field.

Origin 

The GSM Association (GSMA) which brings together about 800 operators and 250 mobile ecosystem companies became the first to come up with the Consumer Remote SIM Provisioning initiative. The beginning of creation the technology was announced in the summer 2014. The complete version of the specification was realized in February, 2016.
Initially, the specification was supposed to be used just by M2M devices, but since December, 2015 it has begun being spread over various custom wearable devices, and into enterprise applications like authentication and identity management.
"This new specification gives consumers the freedom to remotely connect devices, such as wearables, to a mobile network of their choice and continues to evolve the process of connecting new and innovative devices," Alex Sinclair, Chief Technology Officer, GSMA.
Besides, the right of independent service providers to transmit commands of loading profiles to SIM-cards in the device has been amended and the possibility to store arrays of profiles in independent certified data centers (Subscriptions manager) has appeared.

Functions and benefits 

The specification that covers the carrier selection aspects aims to allow consumers to choose a mobile network operator from a wide range to activate the SIM embedded in a device via a subscription. It aims to simplify the users’ life by connecting their multiple devices through the same subscription. It should also motivate mobile device manufacturers to develop the next generation of the mobile-connected devices that will suit better the wearable technology applications. The specification that covers the carrier selection for M2M devices is simpler since typically there is no subscriber involved (e.g. changing the operator in an electricity meter).

The language that is used to describe these specification is a little confusing since eSIM is not a physical format (or "form factor" - the phrase that is used to describe the various SIM sizes). The eSIM describes the functionality in the SIM, not the physical size of the SIM - and there are eSIMs in many formats (2FF, 3FF, 4FF, MFF).

GSMA have also developed a compliance framework for eSIM devices, eUICCs, and subscription management products - to help with interoperability and security for products supporting eSIM. This is published by the GSMA as SGP.24, the eSIM compliance process describes common compliance requirements for:

 Functional interoperability
 eUICC security
 eUICC production site security
 Subscription Management site security

Operation 
Remote provisioning on the host device is initiated by the Local Profile Assistant (LPA), a software package that follows the RSP specification.

When the LPA wants to retrieve a carrier profile it contacts a subscription manager (SM) service on the internet via HTTPS. The address of the SM can be defined:

 in a QR code scanned by the user
 by manually entering entering the SM's host name/Activation code on screen
 hard coded by the host device manufacturer in firmware.
 via a universal discovery service operated by the GSMA.

The LPA is responsible for validating the X.509 certificate of the SM is valid and issued by the GSMA certificate authority. Once validation is complete the LPA will coordinate a secure channel between the eUICC and the SM using challenge-response authentication to enter programming mode. The LPA will request carrier profiles available for download, either by submitting the activation code provided by the user or the eSIM ID (EID) of the eUICC. The SM will provide the requested profile encrypted in a way that only the eUICC can decrypt/install to ensure the network authentication key remains secure.

References 

Mobile phone standards
Computer access control protocols